The Church of Central Africa Presbyterian – Blantyre Synod is a synod of the Church of Central Africa Presbyterian, located in southern Malawi. It was founded by Church of Scotland missionaries in 1876.

History
Blantyre Synod started as a mission of the Church of Scotland. The first missionary was Henry Henderson accompanied by a freed slave. He chose a mission ground suggested by David Livingstone. The Blantyre Mission was founded in 1876, with a church and school. It became a refuge for slaves. The number of Christians grew, and in 1891 the St Michael and All Angels Church was dedicated.

In the late 1920s, responsibility for the church shifted from Scottish missionaries to African leaders.

Partner churches 

Church of Scotland
Presbyterian Church (USA) – Pittsburgh Presbytery
Protestant Church in the Netherlands
Presbyterian Church in Canada
Presbyterian Church of Ireland
Presbyterian Church of Australia

Theology 
Apostles Creed
Nicene Creed
Westminster Confession of Faith
Westminster Larger Catechism
Westminster Shorter Catechism

References

External links

Presbyterianism in Malawi
Presbyterian denominations in Africa
Presbyterian organizations established in the 19th century
Religious organizations established in 1876
1876 establishments in Africa